The Smart Set (1928) is a silent film released by Metro-Goldwyn-Mayer, directed by Jack Conway, and starring William Haines, Jack Holt, and Alice Day.

Cast
William Haines as Tommy
Jack Holt as Nelson
Alice Day as Polly
Hobart Bosworth as Durant  
Coy Watson, Jr. as Sammy
Constance Howard as Cynthia
Paul Nicholson as Mr. Van Buren
Julia Swayne Gordon as Mrs. Van Buren

Plot
A self-centered polo player (Haines) has to redeem himself after he is kicked off the U.S. team.

References

External links
 
 The Smart Set at SilentEra
 
 

1928 films
American black-and-white films
Films directed by Jack Conway
Metro-Goldwyn-Mayer films
American silent feature films
1920s sports comedy films
American sports comedy films
1929 comedy films
1929 films
1928 comedy films
1920s American films
Silent American comedy films
1920s English-language films
Silent sports comedy films